Roy Clements (January 12, 1877 – July 15, 1948), was an American film director and screenwriter of the silent era. He directed more than 130 films between 1914 and 1927. He also wrote for 26 films between 1915 and 1942. He was born in Sterling, Illinois and died in Los Angeles, California.

Selected filmography
 The Light of Western Stars (1918)
 When a Woman Strikes (1919)
 The Tiger's Coat (1920)
 Nobody's Fool (1921)
 A Motion to Adjourn (1921)
 The Double O (1921)
 Her Dangerous Path (1923)
 Tongues of Scandal (1927)

External links

1877 births
1948 deaths
American male screenwriters
People from Sterling, Illinois
Film directors from Illinois
Screenwriters from Illinois
20th-century American male writers
20th-century American screenwriters